The 2022–23 Indian Super League was the ninth season of the Indian Super League, the first season as the only top division, and the 27th season of top tier Indian football. It commenced on 7 October 2022 and concluded with the final on 18 March 2023.

Jamshedpur were the defending premiers and Hyderabad were the defending champions. 

Mumbai City won their second League Winners Shield and ATK Mohun Bagan won their first championship title having defeated Bengaluru in the final.

Changes from last season
 Six instead of four clubs will compete for the playoffs. The top two clubs qualify directly for the playoffs, while the next four sides will play a single-legged match to decide the remaining two teams for the semifinals. The third-ranked team will play against the sixth-ranked team. Similarly, the fourth-ranked team will play against the fifth-ranked team, with the higher-ranked side hosting the match.
 The traditional home and away format has returned.
 The league will be played over five months for the first time. However, there will be no break during the 2022 FIFA World Cup.

Teams 
Eleven teams played in the 2022–23 season.

Stadiums and locations

Personnel and kits

Coaching changes

Foreign players 
The AIFF allows clubs to register a maximum of six foreign players, including one AFC quota player while four can be fielded in a match at a time.

Bold denotes that the player was either signed mid-season or during the winter transfer window.

Transfers

Regular season

League table

Results

Form

Playoffs

Bracket

Knockout

Semi-finals

Final

Season statistics

Top scorers

Hat-tricks

Top assists

Clean sheets

Discipline

Player 
 Most yellow cards: 8
 Suhair Vadakkepeedika

 Most red cards: 1
14 players

Club 
 Most yellow cards: 49
ATK Mohun Bagan

 Most red cards: 3
Chennaiyin

Attendances

Attendances by match

Legend:

Awards

Season awards

Hero of the Month

Hero of the Match

See also
Indian club qualifiers for 2023–24 AFC competitions
2022–23 I-League
2022–23 I-League 2
2023 Super Cup
2022 Durand Cup

References

External links
 

Indian Super League
Indian Super League seasons
 
2022–23 in Indian football leagues